Cedric McKinnon (February 2, 1968 – May 23, 2016) was an American football player who played eight seasons in the Arena Football League with the Cleveland Thunderbolts and Tampa Bay Storm. He played college football at Bethune-Cookman University.

References

External links
Just Sports Stats

1968 births
2016 deaths
American football fullbacks
American football linebackers
Bethune–Cookman Wildcats football players
Cleveland Thunderbolts players
Tampa Bay Storm players
Players of American football from Miami